Ampara (Amparai) may refer to:

 Ampara, a town in Eastern Province, Sri Lanka
 Ampara District, a district in Eastern Province, Sri Lanka
 Ampara Electoral District, a multi-member electoral district of Sri Lanka
 Ampara Electoral District (1960-1989), a former single-member electoral district of Sri Lanka
 Ampara Military Base, military base close to the town of Ampara
 SLAF Ampara, a Sri Lanka Air Force base located near the town of Ampara